Edixson González (born 13 January 1990) is a Venezuelan footballer who plays for Mineros de Guayana of the Venezuelan Primera División as a goalkeeper.

References

External links
 

1990 births
Living people
Venezuelan footballers
Venezuelan Primera División players
Deportivo Anzoátegui players
Zulia F.C. players
Carabobo F.C. players
Atlético Venezuela C.F. players
A.C.C.D. Mineros de Guayana players
People from Guasdualito
Association football goalkeepers
21st-century Venezuelan people